Andrea Cornaro (1547 – c. 1616) or Andreas Kornaros was a Venetian aristocrat, historian and author.

Personal life
Cornaro was a Venetian aristocrat born in Trapezonta Sitia on the island of Crete. He was the son of Giaccomo Cornaro and Issaveta (Zampia) Demezo and the brother of Vincenzo Cornaro. He was married twice, first to Carnarola Zen until her death, and then to Anezina Zen.

Career 

He served as a commander in a galley naval ship and at the age of 24, he participated in the battle of Lepanto with his galley Cristo.

His fiefdom included the villages of Voni, Zofori and Thrapsano in today's prefecture of Heraklion.

In 1591 he founded the Philological Academy of the Weird (L' Accademia degli Stravaganti) in Candia (now Heraklion). He wrote hundreds of poems in Italian. He also wrote History of Crete (Historia Candiana). These works were saved but never printed.

He died in 1616, at the age of 69. His burial took place in the monastery of Saint Francisco in Candia.

References

External links
Γράμματα και Τέχνες στην Σητεία (in Greek)
Το Iόνιο πέλαγος (in Greek)

1547 births
1616 deaths
Greek people of Venetian descent
Greek Roman Catholics
People from Sitia
16th-century Venetian historians
Andrea
Republic of Venice military personnel
Republic of Venice nobility
Republic of Venice poets
16th-century male writers
17th-century male writers
17th-century Venetian historians
Republic of Venice people of the Ottoman–Venetian Wars
Kingdom of Candia